"Wizard" is a song by Dutch DJs and record producers Martin Garrix and Jay Hardway. It was released as a digital download on 2 December 2013 on iTunes. The song peaked at number 6 in Belgium, number 7 in the United Kingdom, and number 17 in the Netherlands. The song was written and produced by Garrix and Hardway.

Composition
The song leads with a "spooky melody" and has similar elements to Garrix's previous single Animals".

Music video
A music video to accompany the release of "Wizard" was first released onto YouTube on 19 November 2013 at a total length of three minutes and thirty-seven seconds (actual length is three minutes and thirty-one  seconds due to the record label's introduction). The clip features clips of Garrix and Hardway performing together as well as clips of people dancing to the song. The video has over 200 million views. Garrix's Vevo channel had also uploaded its music video on 13 February 2014 but not available for worldwide.

Track listing

Charts

Weekly charts

Year-end charts

Certifications

Release history

References

2013 singles
Martin Garrix songs
2013 songs
Spinnin' Records singles
Songs written by Martin Garrix
Electro house songs